Taungmagyi (also known as Shin Nyo is one of 37 nats in the official Burmese pantheon of nats. He is one of two sons of Maung Tint De (Mahagiri Nat) and Shwe Nabay. The King he and his brother were serving under became fearful of their strength and forced them to fight each other to death.

References

13